Olga Kirichenko (born 27 January 1976) is a Ukrainian former swimmer who competed in the 1992 Summer Olympics.

References

1976 births
Living people
Ukrainian female swimmers
Ukrainian female freestyle swimmers
Female butterfly swimmers
Olympic swimmers of the Unified Team
Swimmers at the 1992 Summer Olympics
Olympic bronze medalists for the Unified Team
Olympic bronze medalists in swimming
European Aquatics Championships medalists in swimming
Medalists at the 1992 Summer Olympics
20th-century Ukrainian women